Jeanne-Catherine de Maux (1725-?), better known as Mme de Maux (Madame de Maux), was a natural daughter of Quinault-Dufresne. In 1737, aged twelve, she married a lawyer in Paris. She later became a lover of Denis Diderot's friend Damilaville. Some time after Damilaville's death, in 1768, she became the lover of Diderot, but later left him for a younger man.She is considered significant because many letters written by Diderot to her, containing scientific, philosophical, and romantic content, have survived. Diderot began writing Sur les femmes soon after his romantic relationship with Mme de Maux had ended. It has been stated that his romantic dalliance with Mme de Maux resulted in Diderot producing some of his best writings on love, sex, and sexuality.

Mme de Maux is known to have been a friend of  Mme d'Épinay.

References

Notes

Denis Diderot
18th-century French people
1725 births
Date of death missing